Arcadia High School is a four-year comprehensive secondary school located on a  site in Arcadia, California, United States. It is part of the Arcadia Unified School District.

The high school was opened in 1952. The incoming freshman classes consist of students that feed in from Arcadia's three middle schools: First Avenue Middle School, Richard Henry Dana Middle School, and Foothills Middle School.

The school has a teaching staff of 148. Four hold doctorate degrees, and 110 have master's degrees. The administrative staff consists of the principal, four assistant principals, and one dean of students. A staff of eight full-time and two part-time counselors hold master's degrees and Pupil Personnel Service Credentials, with two of the counselors licensed Marriage/Family/Child Counselors. Arcadia High School is accredited by the Western Association of Schools and Colleges and received another six-year accreditation in June 2017.

Arcadia High School has a GreatSchools rating of 9 out of 10.

History 
The Arcadia School District came to be at the same time as the incorporation of Arcadia in 1903.

About 1975, the closed-campus policy and the dress code were discontinued. The change was influenced by the U.S. Supreme Court decision Tinker v. Des Moines, which stated that students do not "shed their constitutional rights... at the school house door." That year the student population of Arcadia High reached its highest population at about 3,300 students.

In the 1980s, enrollment decreased considerably to about 2,200 students, largely due to the aging demographic in Arcadia. Since then, enrollment has rapidly increased. In the 1990s, the demographics of the school dramatically changed.

A $218 million bond measure was passed on the November 7, 2006, election ballot for the purpose of upgrading and repairing Arcadia schools. A large part of local property taxes are absorbed by the state, and Arcadia is the lowest funded unified school district in Los Angeles County. A new Student Services Center provides a grand entrance to the high school on Campus Drive. The two-story structure includes general and special education classrooms, three computer labs, a television studio, graphic design and digital photography classrooms, and the high school's career center and health, counseling and administrative offices. The brick and glass exterior finish visibly blends with other elements of the campus. Ground was broken in the summer of 2008.

The Science Building is located on the south side of the campus on Duarte Road. The two-story center includes chemistry labs with preparation areas and collegiate-style biology and physics classrooms separated by lecture rooms.

The  Arcadia High School Performing Arts Center is located at the northwest corner of the campus. The center has ground level and mezzanine seating for 1,200, and a stage that accommodate 150 musicians. The building contains a smaller theater, orchestra and dance rooms, and an internal courtyard. The Performing Arts Center construction began in 2010 and opened in October 2012.

Controversies

Native American symbols in branding 
Prior to 1997, Arcadia High School had used several Native American symbols in its branding, including an "Apache Joe" mascot, the Pow Wow school newspaper, the "Apache News" television program, the "Smoke Signals" news bulletin boards, the school's auxiliary team's marching "Apache Princesses" and opposing football team fans' "Scalp the Apaches".

In September 1997, the L.A. School Board banned the use of offensive Native American branding from its schools following criticism from several Native American groups. Members of the groups then advocated the same for Arcadia. The school consulted with Native American groups and made some concessions, including the removal of the "Apache Joe" mascot, the "Apache Princesses", and some other portrayals of Native Americans. The student newspaper Pow Wow was renamed to Arcadia Quill in 2021. The news show Apache News retained its name.

Arcadia High School has established a relationship with the White Mountain Apaches through the Student Council Apache Commission (SCAC). The commission holds fundraisers and drives for the White Mountain Apache Tribe in Cibecue, Arizona, and monitors the school's use of Native American motifs.

In July 2020, following several petitions to change the school's nickname, AUSD Superintendent David Vannasdall announced that the administration will consider possible options after schools resume in-class sessions due to the COVID-19 pandemic.

Athletics

Arcadia High School is governed by the California Interscholastic Federation (CIF) Southern Section as a member of the Pacific League. Its colors are cardinal and gold. The boys compete in baseball, basketball, cross country, football, golf, soccer, swimming, tennis, track and field, volleyball, water polo, and badminton. The girls compete in basketball, cross country, golf, soccer, softball, swimming, tennis, track and field, volleyball, badminton, and water polo. There is a pep squad that is made up of three individual groups: Song, Cheer, and Pep flags. Arcadia's main rival is Crescenta Valley High School. Both teams often contend for the League Championship.

Arcadia teams often qualify for the CIF playoffs. In 2005, boys' soccer was a finalist in the Division III CIF playoffs. The girls track team has lost only two dual meets in the last four years and regularly send athletes to CIF Finals.  More recently, the girls soccer team has won 7 consecutive league titles and had back to back trips to the CIF Quarter Finals for girls soccer.

Cross country, and track and field
The boys' cross country team were placed 3rd, 7th, 8th, 4th, 3rd, 1st, 2nd and 1st in the 2005, 2006, 2007, 2008, 2009, 2010, 2011, and 2012 California Interscholastic Federation CIF-State Cross Country Championships in Division I, respectively. They were led by renowned head coach Jim O'Brien.

In 2005 they qualified for the state championship for the first time in school history. They placed third overall and earned a spot on the state podium. In 2006, Arcadia went to the Nike Team Nationals Championship open race where Andrew Pilavjian led the way for the Apaches as the ninth fastest American runner on the day where he placed seventh in the open race and fourteenth overall (open and invitational races combined, including Kenyan national runners).

In 2008, the team placed fourth in Division I at the state championships and came in second in the Open (non-invitational) race behind Kenya at Nike Team Nationals. Renaud Poizat led the team at the state championship with a fifth place showing. They then placed third at the state championship in 2009, losing by a narrow margin of just 12 points. In 2010, the team took first place at Nike Team Nationals and set a new record for the lowest team time in history. The team remained undefeated the entire season and broke the California state record. Arcadia senior cross country star Ammar Mousa was named the Gatorade boys' cross country runner of the year in California for a second straight year in 2011. As defending state champions in 2011, Arcadia came up short of back-to-back state championships where they placed 2nd, however did end up placing fourth at the national championships. They were led by individual state champion Sergio Gonzalez.

In 2012, the boys cross country team won another state championship, led by Estevan De La Rosa. They went on to win the Nike Cross National Championships.

The Boys Track team has also been successful from 2005, winning over 90% of its meets and three league championships in a row, (2005–07). In 2009, Arcadia track became the first team in the Pacific League to be undefeated on every level. The boys and girls frosh and boys and girls varsity were unbeaten. 44–0. 2009 was the 4th league championship for Arcadia varsity boys track in five years. The girls varsity has repeated as league champion for a third straight year (07-09). Coach Doug Speck was inducted into the Cross Country Coaches Association Hall of Fame at Mt. San Antonio College in 2009.

Arcadia is known for its annual Arcadia Invitational, the largest high school track meet in the nation. The meet has witnessed high school records being broken and has featured future Olympians Quincy Watts, Steve Lewis, Danny Everett, Valerie Brisco-Hooks, Gail Devers, Mike Powell, Michael Marsh, Marion Jones, Allyson Felix, Monique Henderson, Deena Kastor, Michelle Perry, Alan Webb, Cathy Freeman from Australia, Bryshon Nellum and other athletic stars such as USC and Los Angeles Rams wide receiver Robert Woods, USC wide receiver Marqise Lee, George Farmer, De'Anthony Thomas, George Atkins III, and Remontay McClain.

Academic teams
Arcadia is home to several academic teams, including the Constitution Team, Quiz Bowl, Destination Imagination, Mathematics Team, Physics Team, Science Olympiad, National Science Bowl, National Ocean Sciences Bowl, Mock Trial Team, Speech and Debate Team, Solar Cup, Academic Decathlon, and National History Bowl.

Recent achievements:
In 2011 the school won first place at the National Science Bowl, JPL Regional Competition.

In 2010 the school won first place at the National Science Bowl, JPL Regional Competition. 
In 2013 Arcadia High School won first place at the National Ocean Sciences Bowl Regional Competition at JPL, and first place in the National Ocean Sciences Bowl competition at Milwaukee, Wisconsin.
In 2010 Arcadia High School won first place at the National Ocean Sciences Bowl Regional Competition
In 2010 Arcadia High School Constitution Team earned the California State Championship title. In April 2010, Arcadia High School's Constitution Team was declared the national champion of the We the People competition.

Performing arts
Arcadia has a drama program, a dance/prop production program (Colorguard) who has placed third in the nation twice, a dance program, an advanced dance company (Orchesis), four choirs and a large instrumental music program. The Arcadia High School Theatre Department won first place in the High School Intermediate Category for its ensemble performance of Oklahoma!. Competing with schools from all over the United States, they secured the first-place trophy in February 2012. In 2013, the Arcadia High School Theatre Department took home the Drama Teachers Association of Southern California (DTASC) Sweepstakes Trophy. Out of 66 schools throughout Southern California, Arcadia High School won the most first place awards ranking them in first place for the overall sweepstakes award. The Marching Band and Color Guard was selected to perform in the nationally televised 2019 Disney Parks Magical Christmas Day Parade and the 2022 Rose Parade in nearby Pasadena, California on New Year's Day.

Notable alumni

 Ryan Bergara, of BuzzFeed Unsolved and Watcher
 Bruce Bochte, professional baseball player (MLB) 1974–86.
 Stacie Chan, voice of Jade in animated television series Jackie Chan Adventures.
 Renee Chen, Taiwanese singer and songwriter signed by Warner Music.
 Marianne Gravatte, model/actress and 1983 Playmate of the Year.
 Dave Hostetler, professional baseball player 1981–88.
 Mel Hutchins, professional basketball player 1951–58.
 Steve Kemp, professional baseball player 1977–88.
 Mike Lansford, professional football placekicker for Los Angeles Rams 1980–90.
 Marlene Longenecker, president of National Women's Studies Association, 1989-1991
 Bruce Matthews played football at Arcadia High and at USC; played in NFL for Houston Oilers/Tennessee Titans; a first-year (inducted in the first year of eligibility) Hall of Famer of 2007.
 Clay Matthews played football at Arcadia High and at USC; played in NFL for Cleveland Browns and Atlanta Falcons; a 4-time Pro Bowler.
 Mirai Nagasu, national champion and Olympic figure skater, attended Arcadia High School for two years.
 Stevie Nicks, member of pop-rock band Fleetwood Mac, inducted in Rock and Roll Hall of Fame; attended Arcadia High School.
 Brian Ralston, film/TV composer; member of Arcadia Apache Marching Band while in high school.
 Mike Saxon, professional football player.
 Bill Seinsoth, played baseball, holds records at Arcadia High and at USC; Los Angeles Dodgers first-round draft pick; killed in an auto crash shortly thereafter in 1969.
 Mark Smith, professional baseball player (MLB).
Tracy Smith, distance runner; member, 1968 U.S. Olympic team, 10,000 meters; world-record holder, 3-mile; 6-time AAU national champion; 1963 CIF state champion, mile
 Michael Anthony Sobolewski, bassist and founding member of hard rock band Van Halen.
 John Speraw, UCLA men's volleyball head coach; only individual in men's volleyball history to win an NCAA Championship as a head coach, assistant coach (2007, 2009, 2012) and player (1995); MPSF Coach of the Year, 2006. U.S. National Indoor Team assistant coach; gold medal, 2008 Beijing Olympics.{}
 David Tao, Taiwanese singer.
 Mark Tuan, singer, dancer, rapper; member of South Korean boy group Got7.
 Debbie Turner, actress, played role of Marta Von Trapp in the film The Sound of Music.
 Rena Wang, badminton player; invited by World Badminton Federation to compete at 2012 Olympics in women's singles.
 Angel Yin, pro golfer; youngest player in 2017 Solheim Cup

References

External links

Arcadia High School website

High schools in Los Angeles County, California
Public high schools in California
Arcadia, California
Educational institutions established in 1952
1952 establishments in California